Kermit Quinn, who also performs as Quinn, is an American R&B singer. He has been a member of the vocal groups Intro and Blackstreet. He is a native of Atlanta, Georgia.

His song "Let Me Do Me" was featured in the 2005 film Beauty Shop.

Quinn sang on saxophonist Boney James's cover of James Taylor's "Don't Let Me Be Lonely Tonight", on the 2009 album Send One Your Love.

He is currently the lead singer of the cover band JukeBox.

Awards and nominations
Quinn and Boney James were nominated for the Grammy Award for Best Traditional R&B Performance for "Don't Let Me Be Lonely Tonight"; they lost to Beyoncé's cover of "At Last".

Personal life
In 2011, Quinn dated The Real Housewives of Atlanta cast member Sheree Whitfield.

References

External links
 Quinn Twitter page

21st-century African-American male singers
American male singers
American soul singers
Living people
Year of birth missing (living people)